Riocreuxia is a plant genus in the family Apocynaceae, and named in honour of the botanical illustrator Alfred Riocreux (1820-1912). It was first described as a genus in 1844  and is native to Africa.

Species
Species from the Plant List

References

External links

Apocynaceae genera
Asclepiadoideae
Taxa named by Joseph Decaisne